DRS may refer to:

Organisations
 Direct Rail Services, a British freight operating company
 Schweizer Radio DRS, the German language service of Swiss broadcaster SRG SSR
 SF DRS, former name of Schweizer Fernsehen (Swiss Television)
 Design Research Society, an international society
 Département du Renseignement et de la Sécurité, the Algerian state intelligence service
 Drought Relief Service, a defunct US government agency that purchased cattle in counties affected by the Dust Bowl
 DRS Technologies, former name of the US-based defense contractor Leonardo DRS
 Davis Renov Stahler Yeshiva High School for Boys, in Woodmere, New York, US

Music
 DRS (band), an American R&B band
 DRS, real name Darren Scott, member of the Scottish rapper and songwriter duo SHY & DRS
 MC D.R.S., British rapper

Sport
 Dead Runners Society, a worldwide online running club
 Defensive Runs Saved, a baseball statistic
 Drag reduction system, an adjustable bodywork component in motorsport
 Decision Review System, in cricket

Technology
 ICL DRS, a defunct range of computers
 Dynamic resolution scaling, in real-time rendering
 Distributed resource scheduler, in VMware Infrastructure
 Diffuse reflectance spectroscopy

Finance
 Direct Registration System, DRS, see Direct holding system, provides investors with an alternative to holding their securities

Other uses
 Drs, the plural contraction of Doctor
 drs., abbreviation for the Dutch academic title doctorandus
 Discourse representation structure, used in linguistics to represent sentences
 Dresden Airport (IATA code), Germany
 Deposit-refund system, a surcharge on a product when purchased and a rebate when it is returned
 Dandot railway station (station code), Punjab, Pakistan